
Gmina Adamówka is a rural gmina (administrative district) in Przeworsk County, Subcarpathian Voivodeship, in south-eastern Poland.

Neighbouring gminas
Gmina Adamówka is bordered by the gminas of Kuryłówka, Leżajsk, Sieniawa, Stary Dzików, Tarnogród and Wiązownica.

Villages
The gmina contains the following villages having the status of sołectwo: Adamówka, Cieplice, Dobcza, Krasne, Majdan Sieniawski and Pawłowa.

References

Polish official population figures 2006

Adamowka
Przeworsk County